FLEXcon is a worldwide manufacturer of pressure-sensitive film products for applications that include indoor and outdoor advertising, product identification and safety/hazard labels, bar coded labels, primary labels and bonding/mounting.

FLEXcon also develops custom solutions to meet unique converting or application needs.  The company is headquartered in Spencer, Massachusetts, and has operations throughout North America and Europe, with distribution worldwide.

History
From its origin as a small garage-based business in Spencer, Massachusetts, FLEXcon has grown to be a worldwide polymeric coater and provider of pressure-sensitive film and adhesive products.  FLEXcon remains a family-owned, privately held company.

Founding
Neil McDonough’s father, Myles, founded FLEXcon in 1956. In those early years, the company focused on laminating vinyl and metallic polyesters for use in women's shoes and handbags. “You can never remain on a plane. You must either go up or down.” was Myles motto.

Among his values that permeate the company to this day, Myles McDonough emphasized doing whatever it takes to meet customer needs. A typical example of his ingenuity was building a slitter/re-winder using motors from discarded washing machines.

Expansion
Through the years, FLEXcon's product line and capabilities expanded to meet changing requirements within the industry. This included the increased demand for dyed, brushed, embossed, and topcoated products in the '60s; the growth of sheet-form labeling and dramatic expansion of roll-form-labeling in the '70s; the introduction of variable print technologies in the '80s; and the birth of "no-label-look" labels for glass bottles, which FLEXcon pioneered in the '90s for Clearly Canadian.

Quality management
FLEXcon adopted a quality management system in the 1980s, achieving ISO certification and OSHA VPP status in the 1990s, and integrated lean manufacturing practices in the 2000s. All of these programs are ongoing today.

Facilities
FLEXcon employs 1,200 people worldwide (2008), with manufacturing facilities located in Spencer, Massachusetts; Columbus, Nebraska; and Glenrothes, Scotland. The company also has sales offices throughout North America and Europe and distribution worldwide.

References

External links

Neil McDonough receives the 2008 R. Stanton Avery Lifetime Achievement Award

Manufacturing companies established in 1956
Manufacturing companies based in Massachusetts
Privately held companies based in Massachusetts
Spencer, Massachusetts
1956 establishments in Massachusetts